Qullpa (Aymara and Quechua for saltpeter, Hispanicized spelling Collpa) is a mountain in the Wansu mountain range in the Andes of Peru, about  high. It is situated in the Arequipa Region, La Unión Province, Puyca District, and in the Cusco Region, Chumbivilcas Province, Santo Tomás District. It lies northwest of the mountains Qullpa K'uchu and Minasniyuq.

References 

Mountains of Peru
Mountains of Arequipa Region
Mountains of Cusco Region